Aenictus mauritanicus is a species of light brown army ant found in Morocco.

References

Dorylinae
Hymenoptera of Africa
Insects described in 1910